Apollo House may refer to:

Apollo House (Croydon): London, England
 Apollo House, Dublin; a derelict building in Dublin, Ireland which was occupied by activists and the homeless in December 2016
Het Apollohuis: Eindhoven, Netherlands